Be My Cat: A Film for Anne is a 2015 Romanian found footage psychological horror feature film directed, produced, written by, and starring Adrian Țofei, about an aspiring filmmaker who goes to extremes to convince actress Anne Hathaway to star in his film. It is the first entry in Adrian Țofei's planned indie trilogy which includes We Put the World to Sleep and Pure. It is also Adrian Țofei's first film and Romania's first found footage horror movie.

Be My Cat was named by IndieWire one of "the 50 best indie horror movies to stream", by Blumhouse "a new intelligent film" people "need to see", and by Dread Central one of the "top 5 best horror movies of 2016". It won Best Film at the 2015 A Night of Horror Film Festival in Sydney and Best Actor for Țofei at the 2016 Nashville Film Festival.

IndieWire called it "a hidden gem", "a nonstop nightmare" and "a dazzling debut", Austin Chronicle called it "terrifying" and compared it to a modern Peeping Tom, Little White Lies called it "a prime example of meta-cinema" and said it falls between Man Bites Dog and Creep, Dread Central described it as "revolutionary and dangerous", and WatchMojo included the film in top 5 best low budget horror movies alongside classics The Blair Witch Project, The Texas Chain Saw Massacre and Night of the Living Dead. It is considered a cult film.

Be My Cat: A Film for Anne initially received a limited release by Adrian Țofei in 2016, then benefited from a wider release by distributor Terror Films in 2018, and in 2020 cult distributor TetroVideo gave the movie a special limited DVD release. Adrian Țofei also made it available on signed Blu-ray and signed DVD on his website.

Plot
An aspiring Romanian filmmaker and actor obsessed with Hollywood actress Anne Hathaway tries to convince her to come to Romania and star alongside him in his upcoming film. He goes to shocking extremes using three local actresses to shoot demo scenes to send to Anne as proof of his filmmaking and acting skills.

Adrian explains that the film he is making is not, in reality, Be My Cat. Be My Cat is a film he has written so Anne Hathaway can play the leading role. He states that his interest in Anne and making this film came from her portrayal of Catwoman in The Dark Knight Rises, citing a love for cats.

The first actress that he uses as an example of his directorial style is a girl named Sonia, whose parents drop her off with Adrian at an abandoned house down the street from where he stays with his mother. Adrian begins shooting a scene with Sonia that doubles as a frustrating acting exercise. It becomes clear that Be My Cat is about a stalker obsessed with an actress, and the lines start to blur between Adrian as director and Adrian as the character. Increasingly frustrated and frightened, Sonia calls the police. After talking with her, Adrian explains to the police that it was a misunderstanding and convinces Sonia to shoot another scene at night. In the night scene the stalker uses chloroform to abduct the actress. In the second take, Adrian uses real chloroform and knocks Sonia out.

After taking her to his bedroom Adrian procures a cat suit. Before undressing her and putting the cat suit on her, Adrian explains to the camera (now personified as "Anne") that he would never do this in real life, and that it is only him in character. He also states that he is worthy of Anne in every way, betraying that his intentions for Anne may be more than artistic. Adrian stays the night beside the knocked out Sonia. When she wakes up frightened he insists that she must be sacrificed for her art. He chokes Sonia to death and hides her body in the basement.

While going to meet the second actress Adrian explains that he was bullied in the past, and due to this he dislikes boys and dogs for their meanness and likes girls and cats due to their sweetness and innocence. He also explains that the character in his film seeks to turn the actress character into a surrogate of his cat that he accidentally killed, and that this is based on how he accidentally killed his cat as a child. He ironically chances upon a dead cat on the side of the road.

Upon meeting the second actress Flory, Adrian is disappointed, as she had sent him pictures of herself when she was younger. Displeased with her age and weight, Adrian berates her. Flory offers him sexual favors in exchange to let her be in the movie, which disgusts Adrian. He tells Anne that he will not accept.

In the next scene Adrian has apparently allowed Flory to stay as they pick up the third actress, a young girl name Alexandra. Adrian asks Alexandra to wait upstairs and he performs surgery on Flory with a kitchen knife in the basement. Two neighbors come and investigate when they hear Flory's screams but Adrian assures them that they are filming a horror movie. Later that night, Adrian returns with a cat suit, having surgically thinned Flory, intending for her to wear it and be transformed. He is surprised to find her dead from blood loss. He acknowledges and enjoys that he has completely disappeared into his character and therefore can send Alexandra home, already having proved his abilities to Anne.

While Adrian is retrieving trash bags, Alexandra comes downstairs and finds Flory's body. Adrian finds himself faced with a dilemma, not wanting to kill Alexandra but knowing she will turn him in. She tries to talk him out of killing her and briefly tries to escape. Realizing she cannot escape, she continues to reason with Adrian. Adrian finds himself somewhat attracted to Alexandra due to her resemblance to Anne Hathaway, but tells Anne not to be jealous and that he only loves her. Alexandra uses this and tells him that he needs to go to Anne. Adrian says he cannot due to his fear of leaving his hometown. Alexandra says that to win her he must face his fear and go to her. She excites Adrian with the ideas of marrying and having children with Anne Hathaway. He decides that she is right and agrees to let her live, on the condition that she will wait in the basement and give him thirty minutes to escape and leave for Hollywood. Alexandra wishes him luck as he decides that he does not need to make a movie after all, since the movie was just a means to be with Anne. Overjoyed, he turns off the camera, leaving his and Alexandra's fates ambiguous.

Cast
 Adrian Țofei as Adrian
 Sonia Teodoriu as Sonya
 Florentina Hariton as Flory
 Alexandra Stroe as Alexandra

Production 
The character played by Adrian Țofei in ‪the movie was developed over the course of 5 years. It started as a 15 min monologue in a theatre-dance show in college, then Adrian transformed it into a full-length 50 min one-man-show called The Monster, and then the character in The Monster ultimately ended up being adapted for the movie. A year in advance before filming, Adrian moved to his hometown and began to experience some of the circumstances that surround his character's life.

Adrian Țofei, who came from a background in method acting and theatre (Ion Cojar's method), partially improvised the movie in his hometown in Romania on a limited budget as director, producer, writer, lead actor, editor, cinematographer and most other jobs usually performed by a film crew, he never used a camera before in his life, had no crew present during shootings other than him and the actresses, partially lived in character, met the actresses for the first time in character with the camera on, and kept only first takes in the final cut.

A language switch was used during filming to ensure the safety of everyone involved: speaking English meant everyone is interacting in character, and speaking Romanian meant everyone returns to be being themselves (with a few exceptions when the characters had to speak Romanian). Filming was preceded by months of preparation via emails between Țofei and the three actresses.

Adrian Țofei's filmmaking method consists of working for months on an alternative psychological reality for the actors including himself, partially living in character, so that when they start improvising, he mainly needs to record the unfolding events and to make sure the improvisation goes in the right direction. The script mostly consists of plot points. Adrian shoots tens of hours of footage guerrilla style (25 hours for Be My Cat: A Film for Anne), and then he watches the footage like a documentary filmmaker would and creates the details of the story in post-production during the editing process.

Țofei kept his character away from any sexual crimes, first because it would be grotesque and no one would watch the movie, second because Țofei wanted him to have a child-like innocence to become paradoxical, and third because he only belongs to Anne Hathaway in his mind, so he wouldn’t cheat on her by touching other women. On the contrary, he severely punishes the second girl for hitting on him. The character is quite principled in his “relationship” with Anne.

Adrian Țofei's favorite part in Be My Cat is the ending. He told the actress Alexandra Stroe to convince his character during improvisations that his true mission is not making a film with Anne, but being with her personally, to make him realize that he's actually in love with Anne. Adrian Țofei aimed to unexpectedly end a dark, violent and twisted movie with a very pure feeling, hence the final word – “love” – deliberately in high contrast with the rest of the film. He meant the movie to be a character study about the paradoxical human nature, a meta study about filmmaking and acting and a lesson in cinematic realism.

Be My Cat is the first installment in Adrian Țofei's planned indie trilogy which includes We Put the World to Sleep and Pure. All three movies are radically different from each other, yet together they form a cohesive universe.

Release

Festival release

Be My Cat: A Film for Anne had its world premiere on March 1 at the 2015 Fantasporto International Film Festival in Portugal in its initial 109 minutes version, and then the Romanian premiere at the 2015 Transilvania International Film Festival.

The movie's 87 minutes cut premiered at the 2015 Dracula Film Festival in Romania. Over 25 more official selections followed, including at the 2015 A Night of Horror International Film Festival in Sydney (Australian premiere), the 2016 Nashville Film Festival in the US (North American premiere), 2016 Fright Nights in Vienna (Austrian premiere), 2016 On Vous Ment! Mockumentary Film Festival (French premiere), 2016 TromaDance Film Festival in New York City (East Coast Premiere), 2016 Hamilton Film Festival (Canadian premiere), 2016 Toronto Indie Horror Fest (Toronto premiere), 2016 Other Worlds Austin Film Festival (Texas premiere), 2017 Horror-on-Sea Film Festival in the UK, 2017 Shockproof Film Festival in Prague, 2018 Unnamed Footage Festival in San Francisco, 2018 Nightmares Film Festival in Columbus, Ohio, and the 2018 Anchorage International Film Festival in Alaska.

Digital and Blu-ray/DVD release 
Adrian Țofei initially released Be My Cat: A Film for Anne on Vimeo On Demand in December 2016, on Amazon Video in 2017, and, for a limited time, on DVD via Amazon. Cult distributor TetroVideo gave the movie a special limited DVD release with French and Italian subtitles in 2020, featuring a gory artistic rendition of Anne Hathaway on the cover. Adrian also re-released it worldwide on DVD via Amazon, and later on signed DVD and signed Blu-ray on his website.

Terror Films acquired the movie's worldwide VOD distribution rights in late 2017 and gave it a wider release starting with April 2018 on Amazon Prime, iTunes, Google Play, Microsoft / Xbox, Vudu, and later on Steam, Screambox, Vidi, Tubi, Roku and POV Horror. In 2020 Terror Films teamed up with Cinedigm to expand the release, and also with Kings of Horror to release it for free on YouTube.

Reception

Critical response
On Rotten Tomatoes the movie holds an 88% approval rating based on 8 reviews. It is considered a cult film by fans and film professionals.

It has been included by Dread Central in "Top 5 Best Horror Movies of 2016", by Blumhouse in "Top 5 New Intelligent Found Footage Films You Need to See", by IndieWire in "The 50 Best Indie Horror Movies to Stream" and "Top 15 Best Found Footage Movies", by YardBarker in "Top 20 Best Found Footage Horror Films", by Film Threat in "Top 7 Recent European Horror Films Worth Watching", by WatchMojo in "Top 10 Best Low Budget Horror Movies", by WhatCulture in "Top 10 Psychological Horror Movies", by Slash/Film in "Top 25 Scariest Found Footage Horror Movies", by Paste Magazine in "Top 35 Best Found Footage Horror Movies" and by Audiences Everywhere in "Top 50 Best Horror Movies of the 2000s".

IndieWire called the movie "a sublimely meta hidden gem that is nothing short of a nonstop nightmare", "a chilling character study and a dazzling debut for Țofei".

Austin Chronicle called it "terrifying" and wrote that it's "a jaw-dropping character study of a murderer, made all the more grueling and transfixing because of Țofei’s performance. Adrian (the character) is as unlikely a killer as Norman Bates, but that’s what makes him so terrifying. This is emotional extreme horror, but you won’t be able to look away. Adrian Țofei's pointed decision to avoid overt gore, instead concentrating on the interactions, makes the film something akin to a modern Peeping Tom."

Little White Lies wrote that the movie "is a prime example of meta-cinema, endlessly blurring the line between behind-the-scenes reality and onscreen fantasy, between documentary and fiction, while also repeatedly commenting on the process of its own making. The results are an unnerving study in cinephilia and erotomania, falling somewhere between Rémy Belvaux's Man Bites Dog and Patrick Brice’s Creep."

Blumhouse wrote: “Adrian scared the shit out of me, often entering the realm of paralyzing. If you think that’s a joke, give the film a look and tell me the chloroform sequence doesn’t send a wave of shivers racing down your spine.”

Slash/Film said that “Be My Cat is insidiously terrifying and Țofei is magnetic on screen. Even as Adrian’s world grows darker and more unhinged, you can’t avert your eyes.”

Dread Central gave the movie 4 stars and wrote that "Be My Cat takes meta-filmmaking to mind-bending levels and plays out like an arthouse snuff film. Simply calling it unique is an understatement. What we have here is potentially revolutionary and, like the most impactful examples of uncompromising art, potentially dangerous. The line between fact and fiction has never been so terrifyingly and brilliantly blurred."

Paste Magazine wrote that the movie is "a daring and effective example of meta-cinema, as Tofei plays a terrifyingly convincing murderer living with his mother, played by his actual mother. A deeply troubled, sheltered man whose misogyny and perversion combine to create a portrait of passion and obsession, one that is both terrifying yet deeply fascinating."

28DLA gave it 4 stars as well, called it a "disturbing found footage masterpiece" and added that "the authenticity comes from exceptionally strong performances by an excellent cast. Sonia Teodoriu, Florentina Hariton, Alexandra Stroe and Adrian Țofei are so convincing that, at times, it’s uncomfortable to watch."

Dean Bertram from A Night of Horror described Be My Cat as "the most revolutionary addition to the found footage genre since The Blair Witch Project and infinitely more convincing and frightening" and Lloyd Kaufman from TromaDance wrote that it's "a new masterpiece in horror". Jed Shepherd (co-writer of Host) said that “When it comes to underrated/under-appreciated horror movies that are actually very good, few have been more overlooked than the new found footage classic Be My Cat: A Film for Anne. The line between fiction and reality is so effectively blurred, I was watching my front door for a SWAT team to burst through and taser me for watching something I shouldn’t.”

Audiences Everywhere named it "dangerous and progressive" and added that "the film is fascinating, challenging and essential for the evolution of found footage horror." Mondo Exploito wrote that it "totally transcends the trappings of the found footage subgenre to create a truly unique experience that will be talked about for years to come." Addicted to Horror Movies said it's "the rare original horror film that fans scream for", PopHorror wrote, "I couldn't take my eyes off the screen" and Cinehouse called it a "cinematic miracle".

Found Footage Critic rated the movie 9.7 out of 10 and wrote that it's "a near perfect horror/thriller found footage film that sets itself apart in acting, cinematography, plot, tone, execution and production value. Found footage fan or not, this is a film you won’t want to miss! The acting of Adrian Țofei and the three supporting cast, Sonia Teodoriu, Florentina Hariton and Alexandra Stroe, is nothing short of exceptional, resulting in a genuineness that I have yet to encounter in any other found footage film to date.".

Adrian Țofei received praise for his acting performance as well, which has been described by critics as “incredible", “exceptionally strong", “authentic", “excellent throughout", “complex”, “powerfully convincing”, "captivating", "shockingly good", "haunting" and “frighteningly natural“. PopHorror included it "Top 5 Must-See Indie Horror Performances of the Decade" and Artsploitation said that Țofei did "the most believable movie psychopath since Norman Bates." Severed Cinema wrote that Be My Cat is "expertly acted" and called it "horror's answer to the Dogma 95 filmmaking ideals".

Awards and festivals

References

External links
 
 
 Be My Cat: A Film for Anne on Letterboxd

2015 films
2015 horror films
2015 independent films
2015 psychological thriller films
Found footage films
2010s psychological horror films
Films about snuff films
Films about filmmaking
English-language Romanian films
Romanian horror films
Romanian independent films
Camcorder films
2010s mockumentary films
Films shot in Romania
Films set in 2014
2015 directorial debut films
2010s English-language films
Mumblecore films